The Bittern-class sloop was a three-ship class of long-range escort vessels used in the Second World War by the Royal Navy.

Design
The Bittern class were built as light, long-range escort ships with limited anti-air capability. They were fitted with Denny-Brown fin stabilisers and a HACS fire control system.

Enchantress was the first in the class, and was built as an armed Admiral's yacht. The as-completed armament was two single 4.7-inch guns forward and four 3-pounder saluting guns. Anti-aircraft armament and a third, aft, 4.7-inch gun was installed at the outbreak of war.

Stork was unarmed on completion, but with provision for six 4-inch guns, plus AA and ASW weaponry; she served as a survey vessel in the Far East. Her main armament was added at the outbreak of war.
 
Bittern completed as designed, with the same armament as Stork

Ships in class

Service history
Enchantress served as convoy escort throughout the war, and was credited with the destruction of an Italian submarine. She survived the war and was sold into civilian service in 1946, being renamed Lady Enchantress. She was broken up in 1952.
Stork was completed as an unarmed survey vessel, and was only armed after the outbreak of war. She also served as a convoy escort, and was senior ship in 36th Escort Group under Cdr. FJ Walker. She was credited with the destruction of four U-boats. Stork remained in service until being broken up in 1958. 
The third ship in the class was launched as Bittern, and completed as designed. She was involved in the Norwegian campaign, but was lost to air attacks at Namsos in 1940.

Notes

References

External links

 
Ship classes of the Royal Navy
Sloops of the Royal Navy